Primrose is a musical in three acts with a book by Guy Bolton and George Grossmith Jr., lyrics by Desmond Carter and Ira Gershwin, and music by George Gershwin. It centres on a writer whose story-within-a-story forms the basis of the plot. It was written expressly for the London stage, where it ran for 255 performances in 1924 and 1925. The musical played in Australia, but it was not performed in the United States until more than half a century after it was written.

George Gershwin, at 25 years old, was an established songwriter by 1924 when Grossmith and his producing partners, J. A. E. Malone and Edward Laurillard, hired him to produce the score for Primrose for them in London.  The musical is the first in which Gershwin wrote some of the orchestrations himself. The year was one of the busiest for Gershwin, as it also included his Rhapsody in Blue and two other musicals. Gershwin's score, and the book by Bolton are old-fashioned for their time, with more in common with the frothy Edwardian musical comedies than with the later Gershwin musicals.  Nevertheless, Desmond Carter's witty lyrics and the show's farcical book have been praised by reviewers, while Gershwin's score has been compared with Gilbert and Sullivan. A piano vocal edition of the score was published in London in 1924, but Gershwin's manuscript was considered lost until it was found in America in 1982.

Production history
Primrose was produced by Grossmith and J. A. E. Malone, who wanted to follow up on their earlier successes composed by Jerome Kern. It opened at the Winter Garden Theatre in London on 11 September 1924 only two months before the Gershwins’ Lady, Be Good! debuted on Broadway. The cast featured comedian Leslie Henson and also included Claude Hulbert, Heather Thatcher and opera baritone Percy Heming. The director was Charles A. Maynard, and the choreographer was Laddie Cliff. Extensive excerpts from the score were recorded with original 1924 cast members conducted by Ansell, and have been re-released on CD. P. G. Wodehouse rewrote the lyric of 'When Toby is out of Town' as 'The Twenties are Here to Stay', interpolated into a 1960 revival of Gershwin's Oh, Kay!

In their joint memoir Bring on the Girls!, Wodehouse and Bolton relate a story about Grossmith holding auditions for Primrose, where he made a routine request of Sylvia Hawkes, a beautiful young dancer, who later married a series of famous men: 

An Australian production with Maude Fane and Alfred Frith opened in Melbourne, at His Majesty's Theatre in April 1925, before touring nationally. It was produced by J. C. Williamson's company.

The show was not produced on Broadway, where it would have competed with Lady, Be Good!. The American première of Primrose did not take place until 1987, when an unstaged concert production at the Coolidge Auditorium of the Library of Congress was given, without dialogue, together with another Gershwin score, Pardon My English (1933), both conducted by John McGlinn. Soloists included Rebecca Luker and Kim Criswell. The next performance in North America was in 2003, when Musicals Tonight! presented a series of staged concerts at the 14th Street YMCA in New York City's Greenwich Village, with dialogue, but accompanied only by piano, directed by Thomas Mills. Ohio Light Opera mounted the first fully staged American production of the show in 2017.

Roles and original cast
Jason – Ernest Graham
Freddie Falls – Claude Hulbert
May Rooker – Vera Lennox
Sir Benjamin Falls – Guy Vane
Joan – Margery Hicklin
Hilary Vane – Percy Heming
Toby Mopham – Leslie Henson
Michael – Thomas Weguelin
Manager of hotel – Harold Bradley
Pinkie Peach (Mdme Frazeline) – Heather Thatcher
Lady Sophia Mopham – Murial Barnby
Pritchard – Sylvia Hawkes

Plot summary
Primrose consists of three interconnected love stories about Freddie and May, Hilary and Joan, and Toby and Pinkie. Freddie is reluctantly engaged to his cousin Joan, but falls in love with amateur golfer May Rooker. Joan, a naive, pretty young socialite, loves dashing Hilary Vane, a successful author of romantic yarns who lives on a houseboat. Hilary is writing a story whose heroine, Miss Primrose, is at a similar impasse. Hilary returns Joan's love, but Freddie and Joan are under the thumb of Sir Barnaby Falls – Joan's guardian and Freddie's uncle – who, for financial reasons, refuses consent to their marrying anyone except each other.

The romance of aristocratic Toby Mopham and the vulgar but ambitious beautician Pinkie Peach is impeded by Toby's second thoughts after rashly proposing; he enlists Hilary's to pretend to woo Pinkie so that Toby can catch them in flagrante and break off the engagement. However, Joan also catches Hilary wooing Pinkie. During an eventful dance sequence, Toby overcomes his reluctance to marry, Sir Barnaby gives way, and all three couples are free to marry.

Song list
Overture
Leaving Town While We May (The Countryside) – Chorus
Till I Meet Someone Like You – Freddie and May
Isn't it Wonderful – Joan and chorus of men
This Is the Life for a Man – Hilary
When Toby Is out of Town – Toby and chorus of women
Some Far-Away Someone – Joan and Hilary
The Mophams  – Toby, Pinkie and Michael
Finale, Act I – Company
Opening chorus – Chorus
Four Little Sirens – Quartet
Berkeley Square and Kew – Freddie and Joan
Boy Wanted – Pinkie and chorus
Mary Queen of Scots – Freddie and Toby
Wait a Bit, Susie – Hilary, Joan and chorus
Naughty Baby – Joan and chorus of men
Finale, Act II – Company
Ballet – Orchestral
That New Fangled Mother of Mine – Toby
I Make Hay when the Moon Shines – Pinkie
Beau Brummell – Hilary and chorus
Finale, Act III – Company

Notes

References

External links
Piano/vocal score
Full cast list of the London cast
Cast recording listing at Discogs.com
Rare original cast recordings and information about the musical

1924 musicals
West End musicals
Musicals by George and Ira Gershwin